"See Homer Run" is the sixth episode of the seventeenth season of the American animated television series The Simpsons. It originally aired on the Fox network in the United States on November 20, 2005.

Plot
On Father's Day, Homer is unimpressed with Lisa's gift, a book she created with caricatures of herself and Homer as unicorns. Trying to make Lisa feel better, he hangs the book on the refrigerator, but it falls into the refrigerator's water dispenser and gets wet and ruined. Worse, Homer blames the magnet, which Lisa gave him for his birthday.

Lisa takes out her frustrations at school, leading her into trouble, and her parents are called to talk with Principal Skinner. The school psychiatrist Dr. J. Loren Pryor determines Lisa is going through a developmental condition spurned by Homer's antics and could wind up with a hatred for men for the rest of her life, which can only be resolved by Homer trying to make amends for everything. He dresses up as The Safety Salamander, a mascot meant to warn children about electrical power lines, but on the school bus, causes myriad dental injuries when he has Otto stop the bus promptly, and then a fireworks display during a school assembly causes a massive fire in the auditorium.

Meanwhile, Bart—on a dare from the bullies, who plant the idea in his head that he is allowed to steal public property that has his name on it—steals a "Bart Boulevard" street sign. This leads to a fiery multi-vehicle pileup. Homer, still dressed in his Safety Salamander costume, runs to the rescue, extracting people who were trapped in their cars. Homer gets a rousing reception, and Mayor Joe Quimby is blamed for the bumbling response. Springfield's residents criticize Quimby for his many other failures and demand a recall election.

On Lisa's suggestion, Homer decides to run for mayor against candidates numbering in excess of 200, playing on his popularity as the Safety Salamander and building a huge lead in the polls. However, after Marge washes Homer's salamander costume after he vomits in it, it falls apart during a debate forum, and the crowd turns on him. None of the new candidates gain the 5% of master vote needed to oust Quimby. Nevertheless, Lisa confides in Homer that she is proud of him and glad he is her father. They then dance in the deserted ballroom.

Production
In a reference to the "lesser of two evils" justification the public often give when voting for a political party, Homer's campaign slogan for Springfield mayor is "the lesser of 25 evils".

Laughing Matters: Humor and American Politics in the Media Age cites the episode to illustrate an example of "it's only funny because it's true" humour. In the episode Mayor Quimby undergoes a recall election that includes hundreds of questionably-qualified candidates, one of which is Rainer Wolfcastle. This obscure joke references actor and bodybuilder Arnold Schwarzenegger (on whom Wolfcastle is based), who won the 2003 California gubernatorial recall election when incumbent governor Gray Davis was recalled. Laughing Matters notes that while the plot of the episode is about lack of citizen efficacy and the power of name recognition and popularity, the sophisticated humor for a few serves little comedic purpose".

Reception
Simpsons Confidential cites the episode as an example of "increasingly explicit social and political commentary [that] we are now clubbed over the head with" in the Jean era. It says the "single contemporary subject" See Homer Run revolves around is "electoral politics".

Stephanie Gillis was nominated for a Writers Guild of America Award for Outstanding Writing in Animation at the 58th Writers Guild of America Awards for her script to this episode.

References

External links 

 
 "See Homer Run" en TheSimpsons.com 

The Simpsons (season 17) episodes
2005 American television episodes
Television episodes about elections